

Ward Results

Monkseaton

North Tyneside Council elections
1995 English local elections